The following television stations in the United States brand as channel 12 (though neither using virtual channel 12 nor broadcasting on physical RF channel 12):
 KNCT in Belton, Texas
 KTVZ-DT2 in Bend, Oregon
 WMYT-TV in Rock Hill, South Carolina
 KBCW-TV in San Francisco, California
The following television stations in the United States formerly branded as channel 14: 
 KGNS-DT2 in Laredo, Texas

12 branded